An afterburner is an addition to a jet engine to increase thrust.

Afterburner may also refer to:

Media and entertainment
 After Burner, a 1987 flight combat video game
 Afterburner (Transformers), several fictional characters
 Afterburner (ZZ Top album), 1985
 Afterburner (Dance Gavin Dance album), 2020
 Afterburner (modification kit), an aftermarket frontlighting kit for Game Boy Advance
 Afterburner with Bill Whittle, an Internet streaming television show
 Afterburner (Fun Spot), a former roller coaster at Fun Spot Amusement Park & Zoo in Angola, Indiana

Other uses
 Afterburner (wireless networking) or 125 High Speed Mode, an enhancement to the IEEE 802.11g wireless networking standard
 Excess post-exercise oxygen consumption, a post-workout body effect also known as the afterburner effect
 Apple Afterburner card, an accelerator card for the 3rd generation Mac Pro